Sergey Marinich (born 3 June 1998) is a Belarusian professional footballer.

References

External links 
 
 
 Profile at by.tribuna.com

1998 births
Living people
Belarusian footballers
Association football midfielders
FC Isloch Minsk Raion players
FC Chist players